The following is a list of Genesis medleys performed through the years of the band's career after Peter Gabriel's departure in 1975. Performers include Phil Collins, Tony Banks, Mike Rutherford, Steve Hackett, Bill Bruford, Chester Thompson, Daryl Stuermer, Ray Wilson,  Nir Zidkyahu, and Anthony Drennan.

List of Medleys

1976

 Lamb Stew/Casserole/Cutlet: "The Lamb Lies Down on Broadway" – "Fly on a Windshield (Instrumental)" – "Broadway Melody of 1974 (Instrumental)" – "The Carpet Crawlers" (1976)
 "it." – "Watcher of the Skies" (1976)
 "I Know What I Like (In Your Wardrobe)" – "Stagnation (Teaser)" – "I Know What I Like (In Your Wardrobe) (Reprise)" (1976-2022; not played on every tour, sometimes sliced into larger medleys such as "Old Medley" (see below))

1977
 "Lilywhite Lilith" – "The Waiting Room" – "Wot Gorilla?" – only played on one concert (01.01.1977, The Rainbow Theatre, London)
 "The Lamb Lies Down on Broadway" – "The Musical Box (Closing section)" (1977–1978)
 "Dance on a Volcano" – Drum Duet – "Los Endos" (1977–1981)
 "I Know What I Like (In Your Wardrobe)" – "Dancing with the Moonlit Knight (Teaser)" - "Stagnation (Teaser)" – "I Know What I Like (In Your Wardrobe) (Reprise)"

1978
 "The Cinema Show" – "...In That Quiet Earth" – "Afterglow" (1978)
 "Dancing with the Moonlit Knight" – "The Musical Box (Closing section) (1978)

1980
 "Dancing with the Moonlit Knight" – "The Carpet Crawlers" (1980, 1982 (Six of the Best) and 2021-2022 (The Last Domino? Tour))
 (Dukes "Hidden Suite") – "Behind the Lines" – "Duchess" – "Guide Vocal" – "Turn It On Again" – "Duke's Travels" – "Duke's End" (1980) 
 "In the Cage" – "The Colony of Slippermen (c) Raven" – "Afterglow" (1980)

1981–1982
 "Behind the Lines" – "Duchess" – "The Lamb Lies Down on Broadway" (1981)
 "In the Cage" – "The Cinema Show" – "Riding the Scree (Teaser)" – "The Cinema Show (Reprise)" – "The Colony of Slippermen (c) Raven" – "Afterglow" (1981–1982)
 "The Lamb Lies Down on Broadway" – "Watcher of the Skies" (1982)
 "Dance on a Volcano" – "Behind the Lines" – Follow You Follow Me (1982)
 "Fly on a Windshield" – "Broadway Melody of 1974" – "In the Cage" (1982)
 Drum Duet – "Los Endos" (1982, 1983-1984 and 1986-1987)
 "Dance on a Volcano" – Drum Duet – "Los Endos"

1983–1984
 "Turn It On Again" – "Everybody Needs Somebody to Love" – "(I Can't Get No) Satisfaction" – "The Last Time" – "All Day and All of the Night" – "In the Midnight Hour" – "Turn It On Again (Reprise)" (1983)
 "Turn It On Again" – "Everybody Needs Somebody to Love" – "(I Can't Get No) Satisfaction" – "Twist and Shout" – "All Day and All of the Night" – "Baby Let Me Take You Home" – "Karma Chameleon" – "Every Breath You Take" – "Pinball Wizard" – "In the Midnight Hour" – "Turn It On Again (Reprise)" (1983–1984)
 "In the Cage" – "The Cinema Show" –"Riding The scree" "...In That Quiet Earth" – "The Colony of Slippermen (c) Raven" – "Afterglow" (1983–1984)
 Old Medley: "Eleventh Earl of Mar" – "Ripples" – "Squonk" – "Firth of Fifth" (1983, only rehearsal)
 Old Medley: "Eleventh Earl of Mar" – "Squonk" – "Firth of Fifth" (1983)
 Old Medley: "Eleventh Earl of Mar" – "Behind the Lines" – "Firth of Fifth" – "The Musical Box (Closing section)" (January 1984)
 Old Medley: "Eleventh Earl of Mar" – "The Lamb Lies Down on Broadway" – "Firth of Fifth" – "The Musical Box (Closing section)" (February 1984)

1986–1987
 "In the Cage" – "...In That Quiet Earth" – "Apocalypse in 9/8 (Co-Starring the Delicious Talents of Gabble Ratchet)" – "As Sure As Eggs Is Eggs (Aching Men's Feet)" (1986)
 "Turn It On Again" – "Everybody Needs Somebody to Love" – "(I Can't Get No) Satisfaction" – "Twist and Shout" – "Reach Out (I'll Be There)" – "You've Lost That Lovin' Feelin'" – "Pinball Wizard" – "In the Midnight Hour" – "Turn It On Again (Reprise)" (1986–1987)
 "In the Cage" – "...In That Quiet Earth" – "Afterglow" (1987)

1988
 "Turn It On Again" – "Land of Confusion" – "Misunderstanding" – "Throwing It All Away" – "You Can't Hurry Love" – "Shortcut to Somewhere" – "All I Need Is a Miracle" – "That's All" – "Tonight, Tonight, Tonight" – "Invisible Touch" – "Turn It On Again (Reprise)" (1988)

1992
 Old Medley #1: "Dance on a Volcano" – "The Lamb Lies Down on Broadway" – "The Musical Box" – "Firth of Fifth" – "I Know What I Like (In Your Wardrobe)" – "That's All (Teaser)" – "Illegal Alien (Teaser)" – "Your Own Special Way (Teaser)" – "Follow You Follow Me (Teaser)" – "Stagnation (Teaser)" – "I Know What I Like (In Your Wardrobe) (Reprise)" (1992) (from The Way We Walk, Volume Two: The Longs)
 Old Medley #2: "Dance on a Volcano" – "The Lamb Lies Down on Broadway" – "The Musical Box" – "Firth of Fifth" – "I Know What I Like (In Your Wardrobe)" – "That's All (Teaser)" – "Illegal Alien (Teaser)" – "Misunderstanding (Teaser)" – "Follow You Follow Me (Teaser)" – "Stagnation (teaser)" – "I Know What I Like (In Your Wardrobe) (Reprise)" (1992) (from The Way We Walk – Live in Concert DVD)

1998
 Acoustic Medley or Campfire Music: "Dancing With the Moonlit Knight (Intro)" – "Follow You Follow Me" – "Lover's Leap" (1998)

2007
 Duke's Intro: "Behind the Lines" – "Duke's End" (2007)
 "In the Cage" – "The Cinema Show (Instrumental section)" – "Riding The scree (Teaser)" – "Duke's Travels (teaser)" – "Afterglow" (2007)
 "Firth of Fifth" – "I Know What I Like (In Your Wardrobe)" – "Stagnation (Teaser)" (2007)
 "Conversation with 2 Stools (Drum Duet)" – "Los Endos" (2007)

2021–2022
 Duke's Intro''': "Behind the Lines" – "Duke's End" (2021-2022)
 "Fading Lights (First two verses)" – "The Cinema Show (Instrumental section)" – "Riding the Scree (Teaser)" – "...In That Quiet Earth (Teaser)" – "Afterglow" (2021-2022)
 "Firth of Fifth (Instrumental section)" – "I Know What I Like (In Your Wardrobe)" – "Stagnation (Teaser)" (2021-2022)

Notes
The versions of "Old Medley" on The Way We Walk, Volume Two: The Longs and on the video can be distinguished by the song titles Phil Collins intones during "I Know What I Like (In Your Wardrobe)"; "Your Own Special Way" on The Way We Walk, Volume Two: The Longs and "Misunderstanding" on The Way We Walk – Live in Concert'' DVD, but aside from this one line they are identical.

References
 McMahan, Scott. "The Genesis Discography — The scattered pages of a book by the sea". January 1998 Ed.

Genesis (band)
Genesis medleys
Genesis
Genesis medleys